Diana Burgoyne (born 1957) is a Canadian artist known for her installations and performance works using handmade electronics.

Career
Since the mid-1980s, Burgoyne has produced work that combines handmade electronics with aspects of sculpture, installation and live performance. Her work looks at the interaction of society, technology, culture, and environment, and their impact on the human body.

Exhibitions
 The Western Front, Vancouver
 The Mattress Factory, Pittsburgh
 The University of Toronto Art Centre, 
 Exploratorium, San Francisco

References

Bibliography

External links 
 Interview

1957 births
Living people
Canadian installation artists
Canadian women artists
Canadian performance artists
Women performance artists
University of Victoria alumni
University of California, Los Angeles alumni
Artists from Ottawa
Artists from Vancouver